Lester Clark (Goat) Channell (March 3, 1886 – May 8, 1954) was a Major League Baseball outfielder. In 7 career games, he had seven hits in 20 at-bats, with three RBIs. He batted and threw left-handed.

Channell was born in Crestline, Ohio and died in Denver, Colorado.

External links
Baseball Reference.com page

1886 births
1954 deaths
New York Yankees players
Major League Baseball outfielders
Baseball players from Ohio
Mansfield Pioneers players
Fort Wayne Billikens players
Memphis Turtles players
Mansfield Brownies players
Indianapolis Indians players
Denver Grizzlies (baseball) players
Denver Bears players
Buffalo Bisons (minor league) players
People from Crestline, Ohio